Middle Side is a village in County Durham, in England. It is situated on the north side of Teesdale between Middleton-in-Teesdale and Newbiggin.

References

Villages in County Durham